Acheron class may refer to:

 Amphion, A, or Acheron-class diesel-electric submarines of the British Royal Navy, ordered in 1943, for service in the Pacific Ocean theater of World War II. 
 s of the Royal Navy, a class of twenty destroyers, all built under the 1910–11 Programme and completed between 1911 and 1912, which served during World War I.
 s, a class of two torpedo boats built in Sydney for the New South Wales naval service in 1879.